Gaffa Tape Sandy are an English garage rock band, formed in 2015 in Bury St Edmunds and now based in Brighton, England. The band is composed of singer-guitarist Kim Jarvis, singer-bassist Catherine Neilson and drummer Robin Francis.

History
The band gigged locally around their native Bury St Edmunds, and released their demo single "Smart Dressed Guy" in February 2016 before self-releasing their debut EP Spring Killing in April 2017.

This led to the band's performing at Glastonbury Festival in June 2017 on the BBC Music Introducing Stage. The band then released their single "Beehive" in October 2017 on Antigen Records.

In February 2018, the band embarked on a support tour with Kent-based band Indoor Pets around the UK.

In 2018 the band appeared at Live At Leeds, Liverpool Sound City, The Great Escape Festival, Truck Festival, Y Not? Festival, Latitude Festival, and Iceland Airwaves.

Their single "Headlights" was released on 20 March 2019 on Alcopop! Records.

Band members

Current members
 Kim Jarvis – lead vocals, guitar
 Catherine Lindley-Neilson – lead vocals, bass
 Robin Francis – drums

Discography

EPs and singles 
 "Smart Dressed Guy" (2016) - Self Release
 "Water Bottle" (2017) - Self Release
 Spring Killing EP (2017) - Self Release
 "Beehive" (2017) - Antigen Records
 "Pink Neck" / "Train Wreck" / "Manager" (2017) - We Are Hurd (limited 7" vinyl)
 "Smart Dressed Guy" (2018) - R*E*P*E*A*T Records (Record Store Day 2018 limited flexi vinyl)
 "Meat Head" (2018) - Antigen Records 
 "Headlights" (2019) - Alcopop! Records
 "Family Mammal" (2019)

References

External links
 

British garage rock groups
Musical groups established in 2015
2015 establishments in England
Alcopop! Records artists